Caroly is a name that can be a variant of Carol. It is used by notable people including the following:

Caroly Wilcox, stage name of Carolyn Wilcox (1931 – 2021), American theatre professional
Vera Karalli, sometimes credited as Vera Caroly (1889 – 1972), Russian ballet dancer, choreographer and silent film actress
Alberto Caroly Abarza Díaz full name of Alberto Abarza (born 1984), Chilean Paralympic swimmer

See also

Carola
Carole
Caroli (surname)
Caroll
Carolyn